Alma Tell (March 27, 1898 – December 29, 1937) was an American stage and motion picture actress whose career in cinema began in 1915 and lasted into the sound films of the early 1930s.

Early years
Tell was born in New York City, the younger sister of stage and film actress Olive Tell. She attended schools in London and Paris and, with her sister, Olive, graduated from the American Academy of Dramatic Arts in 1915.

Career
Tell began her career as an actress in Syracuse, working for 12 weeks in stock theater. She acted in Boston and headed a stock company in Newark. 

She made her screen debut in the Edward José-directed drama Simon, the Jester, released in September 1915. Tell's career never paralleled that of her older sister, and she often was cast in films as the second leading lady.

Throughout the 1920s, Tell appeared opposite such leading silent film actresses as Mae Murray, Corinne Griffith and Madge Kennedy and then achieved leading lady status in 1923's The Silent Command, opposite actors Edmund Lowe, Martha Mansfield and Béla Lugosi, in his first American film role. 

Tell made her last film appearance in the 1934 romantic-drama Imitation of Life, which starred Claudette Colbert.

Personal life and death
Tell was married to actor Stanley Blystone from 1932 until her death. She died in 1937 and was buried at Pierce Brothers Valhalla Memorial Park Cemetery, North Hollywood, Los Angeles, California.

Selected filmography
 The Smugglers (1916)
 Nearly Married (1917)
 Right to Love (1920)
 On with the Dance (1920)
 Paying the Piper (1921)
 The Iron Trail (1921)
 Broadway Rose (1922)
 The Silent Command (1923)
 San Francisco Nights (1928)
 Love Comes Along (1930)

Theater appearances
The Squab Farm (1918)

References

External links

1898 births
1937 deaths
American film actresses
American stage actresses
American silent film actresses
Actresses from New York City
Burials at Valhalla Memorial Park Cemetery
20th-century American actresses